Bulgarian Eagle was an aircraft-crew-maintenance-insurance (ACMI) carrier founded in 2017. It was a subsidiary of Germania and was founded to increase Germania's presence in the wet-lease market.

History
Bulgarian Eagle received its Air Operator's Certificate on July 31, 2017.

Between August 2017 and February 2019, Bulgarian Eagle operated flights for the Germania Group with 2 Airbus A319 aircraft wearing the Germania livery with the inscription "Operated by Bulgarian Eagle" on the fuselage. The airline planned to operate scheduled flights in the future.

Following the insolvency of Germania in February 2019, Bulgarian Eagle ceased all operations.

Fleet

As of September 2018, Bulgarian Eagle operated the following aircraft:

2 Airbus A319:

LZ-AOA operating for Germania  

LZ-AOC operating for Germania Flug

References

External links
 

Defunct airlines of Bulgaria
Airlines established in 2017
Airlines disestablished in 2019
2019 disestablishments in Bulgaria
Bulgarian companies established in 2017